The Lincoln-Mercury Open was a golf tournament on the LPGA Tour from 1969 to 1973. It was played at the Round Hill Country Club in Alamo, California.

Winners
1973 Sandra Haynie
1972 Sandra Haynie
1971 Pam Higgins
1970 Judy Rankin
1969 Donna Caponi

References

Former LPGA Tour events
Recurring sporting events established in 1969
Recurring events disestablished in 1973
Golf in California
1969 establishments in California
1973 disestablishments in California
Women's sports in California